Royden Gladstone Dryburgh (1 November 1929 – 10 May 2000) was a South African rugby union player, who captained the Springboks in two test matches.

Playing career
Dryburgh played provincial for Western Province from 1949 to 1955 and for Natal from 1956 to 1960.

Dryburgh made his test debut for the Springboks in 1955 against the touring British Lions team captained by Robin Thompson. His first test match was the second test played at his home ground, Newlands in Cape Town and he scored a try and two conversions in the test. In 1960 he was captained the Springboks in the first two tests against the touring All Blacks. Dryburg scored 28 points in test matches, including three tries. He also played in twelve tour matches, scoring eighty-eight points.

Test history 

Legend: try (3 pts); pen = penalty (3 pts.); conv = conversion (2 pts.), drop = drop kick (3 pts.).

See also
List of South Africa national rugby union players – Springbok no. 321

References

1929 births
2000 deaths
South African rugby union players
South Africa international rugby union players
Western Province (rugby union) players
Sharks (Currie Cup) players
Hamilton RFC, Sea Point players
Rugby union players from Cape Town
Rugby union fullbacks
Rugby union wings